Darwaza is a village near Ayubia, situated in the Palak Union Council of the Abbottabad District, Khyber Pakhtunkhwa, Pakistan.

References

Galyat of Pakistan
Populated places in Abbottabad District
Hill stations in Pakistan